Leila Aïchi (born 14 May 1970) is a French politician. She represents  the department of Paris in the French Senate.

She was born in Beaumont-sur-Oise. A lawyer by profession, she was elected to the Senate on September 25, 2011.

She supported Emmanuel Macron in the 2017 French presidential election. She stood in the 2017 French legislative election as a miscellaneous right in the 9th constituency for French residents overseas but came in second place.

A member of the Paris bar, she specializes in environmental issues.

Originally a member of Europe Ecology – The Greens (Europe Écologie Les Verts or EELV), in the 2015 regional election for Île-de-France, she supported Valérie Pécresse instead of Claude Bartolone. She also announced that she was leaving EELV.

References 

1970 births
Living people
French Senators of the Fifth Republic
Women members of the Senate (France)
20th-century French women politicians
Senators of Paris
Politicians from Île-de-France
French people of Algerian descent
French women lawyers
20th-century French lawyers
21st-century French lawyers

Candidates for the 2017 French legislative election
21st-century French women politicians